was a Japanese samurai artist from the Matsumae clan. His first success was a group of 12 portraits called the Ishu Retsuzo. The portraits were of 12 Ainu chiefs from the northern area of Ezo, now Hokkaido.

Biography
Kakizaki Hakyō was born in Matsumae Castle in 1764, the fifth son of the Matsumae Domain  daimyō . The following year he was adopted as successor by karō (chief retainer or house elder) . At a young age he travelled to Edo, where he studied under  and Sō Shiseki, learning the style of the Nanpin school. In 1791 he journeyed to Kyōto, where he studied under Maruyama Ōkyo. In 1826, after falling ill in Edo, he died in his home town of Matsumae.

See also

 List of Cultural Properties of Japan - paintings (Hokkaidō)
 Ainu genre painting

References

Matsumae clan
1764 births
1826 deaths